Samsaram is a 1988 Telugu-language drama film, produced by Sakhamuuri Ramachandra Rao under the SR Films banner and directed by Relangi Narasimha Rao. It stars Sobhan Babu, Jaya Prada, Sharada, Rajendra Prasad and Rajani, with music composed by Raj–Koti. The film is a remake of the Malayalam film Oru Painkilikatha (1984) which was earlier remade in Tamil as Thaaiku Oru Thaalaattu (1986). The film was recorded as a Super Hit at the box office.

Plot
The film begins with Raja Shekaram (Sobhan Babu) a martinet, who leads a happy family life with his wife Lakshmi (Sharada) and 3 children. His elder son Hari (Hari Prasad) & daughter Radha (Varalakshmi) move in his path. Excluding the second son, Ravi (Rajendra Prasad) that works as labor in his father's factory blisses life. He loves an orphan girl Gowri (Rajani). With the help of their well-wisher Gopalam (Gollapudi Maruthi Rao), Ravi copes by setting her as a servant. Meanwhile, Raja Shekaram couples Radha with a well-educated guy, Kumar (Sudhakar). During that time, Raja Shekaram senses Ravi's love affair which makes him quit the house and espousals Gowri. Soon after, labor disputes arise in Raja Shekaram's factory, and the union leader Seshagiri / Seshu (Prasad Babu) drags Ravi in between and creates a feud between father & son. Now the Govt. appoints a special labor officer, Padmavathi (Jaya Prada) for resolution. Here, Raja Shekaram gets shocked to spot her as she is his ex. Later, he divulges the past to Lakshmi, in his college days Raja Shekaram & Padmavathi are suitors but a plight made him marry Lakshmi. Immediately, Lakshmi meets Padmavathi which makes her worry about her husband and leaves her breath. Thereafter, Raja Shekaram becomes alone, even Padmavathi too heads out. Currently, Raja Shekaram shifts to his elder son Hari but as he is bustling, Raja Shekaram returns. By that time, Kumar occupies his house and necks him out. At that moment, Ravi arrives for his protection when Raja Shekaram understands his virtue. Finally, the movie culminates happily with Raja Shekaram spending the rest of his life with Ravi & Gowri.

Cast
Sobhan Babu as Raja Sekharam
Jaya Prada as Padmavathi
Sharada as Lakshmi
Rajendra Prasad as Ravi Babu 
Rajani as Gowri
Gollapudi Maruthi Rao as Gopalam
Sudhakar as Kumar
Prasad Babu as Seshagiri / Seshu
Hari Prasad as Hari Babu
Sakshi Ranga Rao as Manager Dharma Rao
Rajyalakshmi as Lalitha
Varalakshmi as Radha
Baby Raasi as Raja Shekaram's granddaughter

Soundtrack

Music composed by Raj–Koti. Music released on LEO Audio Company.

Other
 VCDs & DVDs on - HYDERABAD Video Company, Hyderabad

References

External links

Indian drama films
Films directed by Relangi Narasimha Rao
Films scored by Raj–Koti
1988 drama films
1988 films
Telugu remakes of Malayalam films
1980s Telugu-language films